Rick's Redemption is a 1913 American silent short film starring William Garwood and Muriel Ostriche.

External links

1913 films
American silent short films
American black-and-white films
1910s American films